The Lewis Central Community School District is a public school district headquartered in Council Bluffs, Iowa, U.S.

The district is located primarily in southwestern Council Bluffs. It serves the southern portion of the Council Bluffs as well as rural Pottawattamie County and a small part of northern Mills County.

Schools
Lewis Central High School  (Grades 9–12)
Lewis Central Middle School (Grades 6–8)
Titan Hill Intermediate School (Grades 2–5)
E.A. Kreft Primary School (Preschool-Grade 1)

Lewis Central Community High School

Athletics
The Titans compete in the Hawkeye 10 Conference in the following sports:

Fall Sports
Cross Country (boys and girls)
Football
1-time Class 4A State Champions (2021)
Volleyball
Girls swimming

Winter Sports
Basketball (boys and girls)
Bowling
Wrestling
 3-time Class 3A State Champions (2000, 2001, 2004)

Spring Sports
Golf (boys and girls)
Soccer (boys and girls)
Tennis (boys and girls)
Track and Field (boys and girls)

Summer Sports
Baseball
Softball

Student demographics
The following figures from the Iowa Department of Education are as of February 2020.

Total District Enrollment: 3,017
Student enrollment by gender
Male: 1,548 (51.3%)
 Female: 1,469 (48.7%)
Student enrollment by ethnicity
Asian: 19 (.6%)
Black: 41 (1.4%)
Multi-Race 124 (4.1%)
Hispanic: 316 (10.5%)
White: 2505 (83%)

See also
List of school districts in Iowa
List of high schools in Iowa

References

External links
Lewis Central Community School District – Official site.

School districts in Iowa
Council Bluffs, Iowa
Education in Pottawattamie County, Iowa
Education in Mills County, Iowa